The Șar is a right tributary of the river Mureș in Romania. It discharges into the Mureș in Glodeni. Its name originates from the Hungarian "sár" meaning “mud”, so the Hungarian name means “Muddy Creek”.

References

Rivers of Romania
Rivers of Mureș County